Palais Baréty is a historic building in Nice, Alpes-Maritimes, France. It was built in 1897 for Alexandre Baréty, a physician. It was designed by architect Lucien Barbet. It has been listed as an official national monument since June 16, 1996.

References

Buildings and structures completed in 1897
Monuments historiques of Nice
19th-century architecture in France